Lola the Truck Driver 3 (Spanish:El gran reto - Lola la Trailera 3) is a 1991 Mexican action film directed by Raúl Fernández hijo and starring Rosa Gloria Chagoyán, Rolando Fernández and Frank Moro. It is the third and last in a trilogy of films begun by Lola the Truck Driver in 1983.

Cast
 Rosa Gloria Chagoyán as Lola Chagano 
 Rolando Fernández as Jorge Stander 
 Frank Moro as El Maestro  
 Manuel 'Flaco' Ibáñez 
 Guillermo Rivas as Mechanician  
 Susana Cabrera 
 Alfredo Solares 
 Charly Valentino 
 Enrique Cuenca 
 Joaquin Garcia Vargas as Lola's Godfather  
 Guillermo de Alvarado
 Luis Aguilar 
 María Cardinal
 Ricardo Carrión
 Viviana Rey as Korna  
 Julio Fernandez 
 David Fuentes 
 Daniel Benítez as himself - Reporter  
 Paco Sañudo as Gay at Ana Paula's  
 Rene Vela 
 Daniela Mori 
 Armando Castillon 
 Lucía Gálvez 
 Adolfo Magaldi 
 Verónica Torriz 
 Rubén Fernández 
 Sonia Velazquez 
 Memo Ruiz 
 Luis A. Rodriguez 
 José Antonio Garzón 
 Jesús Iñiguez 
 Eduardo Garante 
 Toño Soriano 
 Juan Almazan 
 Manuel Garza 
 José Manuel Fernández 
 Gilberto Hamilton 
 Jones Carrabazal 
 Fernando Ortiz 
 Antonio Ortiz
 Alejandro Herédia
 Eduardo Sánchez Torell 
 Hugo González Guzmán
 Miguel Ángel Sánchez 
 Richard Mossulske

References

Bibliography 
 Victoria Ruétalo, Dolores Tierney. Latsploitation, Exploitation Cinemas, and Latin America. Routledge, 2009.

External links 
 

1991 films
1991 action films
Mexican action films
1990s Spanish-language films
Films directed by Raúl Fernández
Mexican sequel films
1990s Mexican films